The 1993 European Women Basketball Championship, commonly called EuroBasket Women 1993, was the 24th regional championship held by FIBA Europe. The competition was held in Italy and took place from 8 June to 13 June 1993.  won the gold medal and  the silver medal while  won the bronze.

Qualification

Group A

Group B

1 Following the dissolution of Czechoslovakia on 1 January 1993, the former Czechoslovak team was replaced by the new Slovak national team.
2 Poland was invited to the EuroBasket to replace FR Yugoslavia, which was disqualified in application of the United Nations Security Council Resolution 757.

Squads

First stage

Group A

Group B

3 Following the dissolution of the Soviet Union the former Soviet team, the defending champion, was replaced by the new Russian national team.

Play-off stages

Final standings

External links 
 FIBA Europe profile
 Todor66 profile

1993
EuroBasket
International women's basketball competitions hosted by Italy
EuroBasket Women
Euro
Women